Rehimana Harerangi Meihana (31 March 1934 – 11 May 2022), also known as Harry Lang Mason, was the seventh tumuaki or president of the Rātana Established Church of New Zealand. His mother was Rāwinia Rātana, a daughter of the founder of the faith, Tahupōtiki Wiremu Rātana. He served as tumuaki from his election on 5 April 1999 until his death on 11 May 2022, at Rātana Pā, aged 88 years.

References

1934 births
2022 deaths
New Zealand Rātanas
New Zealand Protestant ministers and clergy
New Zealand Māori religious leaders
Ngāti Apa people